Chiheb Zoghlami (born 19 December 1991) is a Tunisian footballer who currently plays as a forward for Stade Tunisien .

Career
He formerly played for CS Sfaxien, Stade Gabèsien, AS Gabès, Hammam-Sousse, AS Ariana, AS Djerba, Club Africain, Al-Nahda, US Ben Guerdane, CS Hammam-Lif, US Ben Guerdane again, Stade Tunisien, and Ohod.

References

External links
 

1991 births
Living people
Tunisian footballers
Tunisian expatriate footballers
CS Sfaxien players
Stade Gabèsien players
AS Gabès players
ES Hammam-Sousse players
AS Ariana players
AS Djerba players
Club Africain players
Al-Nahda Club (Oman) players
US Ben Guerdane players
CS Hammam-Lif players
Stade Tunisien players
Ohod Club players
Tunisian Ligue Professionnelle 1 players
Oman Professional League players
Saudi First Division League players
Expatriate footballers in Oman
Expatriate footballers in Saudi Arabia
Tunisian expatriate sportspeople in Saudi Arabia
Association football forwards